Platipus Records was a British trance music record label that was based in London, England. It was founded in 1993 by Simon Berry, and early releases included Union Jack and Art of Trance.  Later, the label included artists like Dawnseekers and Quietman. Sublabels included Gekko and Platipus Euro. Platipus Records Ltd ceased trading in 2010. Berry and the label's artists relaunched under the Porcupine Records label, but this was superseded by the founding of Platipus Music at the end of 2011.

History
It was founded in 1993 by Simon Berry. The early releases were almost exclusively limited to Berry's various projects, including Union Jack, Clanger, and Art of Trance.  Later, the label included artists like Dawnseekers and Quietman. Some of their most famous releases were the hits "Anomaly (Calling Your Name)" by BT, "Robert Miles - Children",  and DJ Taylor, "Red Herring" and "Two Full Moons and a Trout" by Union Jack, and "Air" by Albion. Because of the success of "Calling Your Name" and "Madagascar" by Art of Trance in 1999, the label started to take on a more epic trance style, in stark contrast to their early releases of psychedelic and acid trance. They also featured many releases from Pob.

During the next few years the sublabels Gekko and Platipus Euro were established, showcasing more progressive and uplifting styles, respectively. Artists featured on Platipus Euro include Neo & Farina and RAH. Gekko releases tribal and techno-ish "flavours" of trance, and is unrelated to Disco Gekko Records.

Platipus Records Ltd ceased trading in April 2010, 17 years after being founded. Initially, Simon Berry and the label's artists relaunched under the 'Porcupine Records' label, but this was superseded by the founding 'Platipus Music' at the end of 2011.

Artists

Platipus Records
Albion
AMbassador
Art of Trance
BT
Clanger
Dawnseekers
Innate
Kansai
L.S.G.
Moogwai
Neo & Farina
Nicely
Paragliders
Pob
Poltergeist
Quietman
S.O.L.
Technossomy
Terra Ferma (Claudio Guissani)
Union Jack
Z2
RAH

Discography

Platipus Records; The Ultimate Dream Collection (1995)
1993: "Deeper than deep EP" by Art of Trance, PLAT01
1993: "Vicious circles" by Poltergeist, PLAT02
1993: "Gloria" by Art of Trance, PLAT05
1993: "Two full moons and a trout/Lollypop man" by Union Jack, PLAT06
1994: "Cambodia" by Art of Trance, PLAT07
1995: "Octopus" by Art of Trance, PLAT12
1995: "Vicious circles - The remixes" by Poltergeist, PLAT13
1995: "Octopus (remixes)" by Art of Trance, PLAT17
1996: "Children" by Robert Miles, PLAT18
1996: "Floating/The scream" by Terra Ferma, PLAT21
1996: "Anomaly (Calling Your Name)" by Libra presents Taylor, PLAT24
1997: "Kaleidoscope" by Art of Trance, PLAT27
1997: "Hidden sun of Venus" by L.S.G., PLAT28
1997: "Turtle Crossing" by Terra Ferma, PLAT30
1997: "The awakening" by Pob feat. X-Avia, PLAT31
1997: "Seadog" by Clanger, PLAT33
1997: "Cockroach/Yeti" by Union Jack, PLAT36
1998: "The sleeper" by Quietman, PLAT37
1998: "Air" by Albion, PLAT38
1998: "Madagasga" by Art of Trance, PLAT43
1999: "Vicious games (Art Of Trance remix)" by Yello vs Hardfloor, PLAT52
1999: "Anomaly (Calling Your Name) (Remixes)" by Libra presents Taylor, PLAT56
1999: "A night out/Moogwai" by Moogwai, PLAT57
1999: "Madagascar (Remixes)" by Art of Trance, PLAT58
1999: "Quantensprung/Solaris" by S.O.L., PLAT59
1999: "The Fade" by AMbassador, PLAT62
2000: "I want you" by Z2, PLAT67
2000: "One of these days" by AMbassador, PLAT69
2000: "Viola" by Moogwai, PLAT71
2000: "The wolf" by Terra Ferma, PLAT72
2000: "Air 2000" by Albion, PLAT73
2000: "Lithium" by Paragliders, PLAT74
2000: "Breathe" by Art of Trance, PLAT76
2000: "Gothic dream" by Dawnseekers, PLAT77
2000: "Waah" by Pob, PLAT78
2000: "Changes" by Innate, PLAT81
2000: "Vicious circles 2000 remixes" by Vicious Circles, PLAT82
2001: "The labyrinth" by Moogwai, PLAT83
2001: "Killamanjaro" by Art of Trance, PLAT89
2001: "Luna" by Pob & Boyd, PLAT91

See also
 List of record labels
 List of electronic music record labels

References

External links
 Official site

British record labels
Electronic music record labels
Trance record labels
Psychedelic trance record labels
1993 establishments in the United Kingdom
Defunct companies based in London
2010 disestablishments in the United Kingdom